Shirsh Bihar United is a professional football club from Bihar, based in Muzaffarpur. It currently participates in Bihar State Soccer League.

History 
Shirsh Bihar United FC was first nominated for I-League 2nd division in 2018, but did not participate in the league because they had not completed one year.

On 20 October 2019, Bihar United played their last league match of District football league Motihari and became champions of A division.

Shirsh Bihar also participated in International tournaments such as Dana Cup in Denmark and Barcelona Summer Cup in Spain.

Bihar United women's team won the first edition of Bihar State Women's League and qualified for the Indian Women's League. which was held in Muzaffarpur

Shirsh Bihar was nominated for the 2021-22 I-League 2nd Division.

Stadium 
Shirsh Bihar United play their home matches at the Khudiram Bose Stadium in Muzaffarpur.

For women's league matches, SBU uses Moin-ul-Haq Stadium.

Players

Personnel

Honours

Leagues
Bihar Soccer League
Champion(1): 2021
East Champaran district league
Champions (3): 2018, 2019, 2020

Women's team
Bihar State Women's League
Champions (1): 2021

Cups
Chaturbhuj Cup
Runner-up (1): 2018
Monsoon Football Cup
Champions (1): 2021

Affiliated clubs
The following club is currently affiliated with Shirsh Bihar United:
 Montreal Manic FC (2020–present)

See also 

 Bihar Football Association

References 

I-League 2nd Division clubs
Association football clubs established in 2019
2017 establishments in India